Pavlodar is a district of Pavlodar Region in northern Kazakhstan. The administrative center of the district is the city of Pavlodar. Population:

References

Districts of Kazakhstan
Pavlodar Region